The 1972 Milan–San Remo was the 63rd edition of the Milan–San Remo cycle race and was held on 18 March 1972. The race started in Milan and finished in San Remo. The race was won by Eddy Merckx of the Molteni team.

General classification

References

1972
1972 in road cycling
1972 in Italian sport
1972 Super Prestige Pernod